Nicole Hetzer (born February 18, 1979 in Leipzig, Saxony) is a retired female medley swimmer from Germany.

Swimming career
Hetzer competed twice for her native country at the Summer Olympics: 2000 and 2004. Hetzer collected several medals at international tournaments in the late 1990s and early 2000s (decade), especially in the short course (25 metres). Despite being of German nationality she won the 400 metres medley title in 1997 at the ASA National British Championships.

References

sports-reference

1979 births
Living people
German female medley swimmers
Swimmers at the 2000 Summer Olympics
Swimmers at the 2004 Summer Olympics
Olympic swimmers of Germany
Swimmers from Leipzig
Medalists at the FINA World Swimming Championships (25 m)
European Aquatics Championships medalists in swimming
Universiade medalists in swimming
Universiade bronze medalists for Germany
Medalists at the 2005 Summer Universiade
Sportspeople from Leipzig